Manisha Saxena is an Indian model and television actress. She is known for MTV India's reality show MTV Love School. She appeared in the movie Wajah Tum Ho (2016). In 2017 she portrayed the role of Isha Singh on Pehredaar Piya Ki. She appeared on SET India television series Rishta Likhenge Hum Naya as Isha.

Career 
In 2017, Saxena has done SET India's television series Pehredaar Piya Ki.Parallel lead of the show . She also appeared on Rishta Likhenge Hum Naya as Isha Sajjan Singh. She appeared as Lavanya negative lead of the show on Sab Tv in Mangalam Dangalam. [S. In 2020, she starred RadhaKrishn as Jambavati (replaced Vaidehi Nayar). She was on the cover of India Today magazine.

Television

Filmography

References

External links 

 

Living people
Actresses from Mumbai
Actresses from Pune
Actresses in Hindi cinema
Actresses in Hindi television
Female models from Mumbai
Indian film actresses
Indian television actresses
People from Pune
Delhi University alumni
Year of birth missing (living people)